The 2014 Oklahoma gubernatorial election was held on November 4, 2014, to elect the governor of Oklahoma. Incumbent Republican Governor Mary Fallin was running for re-election to a second term in office. Fallin was re-elected, defeating Democratic candidate Joe Dorman, a state legislator.

Republican primary
Fallin, the incumbent, easily defeated Chad "The Drug Lawyer" Moody and Dax Ewbank who would run as a Libertarian for U.S. Senate in 2016.  Ewbank and Moody both stressed ending the War on Drugs and protecting 2nd Amendment rights.

Candidates

Declared
 Dax Ewbank
 Mary Fallin, incumbent governor
 Chad Moody, attorney

Withdrew
 Randy Brogdon, former state senator and candidate for Governor in 2010 (ran for the U.S. Senate and lost)

Declined
 T.W. Shannon, former Speaker of the Oklahoma House of Representatives (ran for the U.S. Senate and lost)

Results

Democratic primary
Dorman was unopposed for the Democratic nomination.

Candidates

Declared
 Joe Dorman, state representative

Withdrew
 R. J. Harris, Libertarian candidate for president in 2012 and candidate for Oklahoma's 4th congressional district in 2010 and 2012 (endorsed Dorman)

Declined
 Dan Boren, former U.S. Representative (endorsed Dorman)
 David L. Boren, President of the University of Oklahoma, former U.S. Senator and former Governor (endorsed Dorman)
 Brad Henry, former Governor (endorsed Dorman)
 M. Susan Savage, former Mayor of Tulsa and former Secretary of State of Oklahoma (endorsed Dorman)

Independents

Candidates

Declared
 Richard Prawdzienski, former Chair of the Libertarian Party of Oklahoma and candidate for Lieutenant Governor of Oklahoma in 2010
 Kimberly Willis

Disqualified
 Joe Sills

General election

Debates
Complete video of debate, October 2, 2014

Predictions

Polling

 * Internal poll for the Joe Dorman campaign

Results

See also
 2014 United States elections
 2014 United States gubernatorial elections
 2014 United States Senate elections

References

External links
Oklahoma gubernatorial election, 2014 at Ballotpedia

Gubernatorial
2014
Oklahoma